The 75th Golden Globe Awards honored film and American television of 2017, and was broadcast live on January 7, 2018, from The Beverly Hilton in Beverly Hills, California beginning at 5:00 p.m. PST / 8:00 p.m. EST by NBC. This Golden Globe Awards ceremony was produced by Dick Clark Productions in association with the Hollywood Foreign Press Association.

Talk-show host Seth Meyers hosted the ceremony for the first time. Oprah Winfrey was announced as Cecil B. DeMille Lifetime Achievement Award honoree on December 13, 2017. The nominees were announced on December 11, 2017, by Sharon Stone, Alfre Woodard, Kristen Bell and Garrett Hedlund.

Three Billboards Outside Ebbing, Missouri won the most awards for the evening with four, including Best Motion Picture – Drama. The Shape of Water and Lady Bird won two awards each. Big Little Lies, The Handmaid's Tale, and The Marvelous Mrs. Maisel were among the television shows that received multiple awards.

Winners and nominees
The nominees for 75th Golden Globe Awards were announced on December 11, 2017. Winners are listed first in boldface.

Film

Films with multiple nominations
The following seventeen films received multiple nominations:

Films with multiple wins
The following films received multiple wins:

Television

Series with multiple nominations
The following fourteen series received multiple nominations:

Series with multiple wins
The following three series received multiple wins:

Ceremony 
During a pre-show event the award for "Best Podcast" was announced. The event was streamed live on YouTube. In support of the #MeToo and Time's Up movements, practically all the attendees wore black. Many of the acceptance speeches specifically mentioned these causes, including that of Oprah Winfrey.

Presenters 

 Gal Gadot and Dwayne Johnson with Best Actress – Miniseries or Television Film
 Viola Davis and Helen Mirren with Best Supporting Actor – Motion Picture
 Zac Efron introduced The Greatest Showman
 Jennifer Aniston and Carol Burnett with Best Actress – Television Series Musical or Comedy and Best Actress – Television Series Drama
 Sarah Paulson introduced The Post
 Garrett Hedlund and Kerry Washington with Best Actor – Television Series Drama
 Roseanne Barr and John Goodman with Best Television Series – Drama
 Seth Rogen introduced The Disaster Artist
 Christina Hendricks and Neil Patrick Harris with Best Supporting Actor – Series, Miniseries or Television Film
 Mariah Carey and Common with Best Original Score
 Kelly Clarkson and Keith Urban with Best Original Song
 Octavia Spencer introduced The Shape of Water
 Emma Stone and Shirley MacLaine with Best Actor – Motion Picture Musical or Comedy
 Sharon Stone and J. K. Simmons with Best Supporting Actress – Series, Miniseries or Television Film
 Sebastian Stan and Allison Janney introduced I, Tonya
 Amy Poehler and Andy Samberg with Best Animated Feature Film
 Kate Hudson and Aaron Taylor-Johnson with Best Supporting Actress – Motion Picture
 Catherine Zeta-Jones and Kirk Douglas with Best Screenplay
 Sarah Jessica Parker with Best Foreign Language Film
 Hugh Grant introduced Dunkirk
 Darren Criss, Penélope Cruz, Ricky Martin, and Édgar Ramírez with Best Actor – Miniseries or Television Film
 Halle Berry introduced Get Out
 Emilia Clarke and Kit Harington with Best Television Series – Musical or Comedy and Best Actor – Television Series Musical or Comedy
 Reese Witherspoon with the Cecil B. DeMille Lifetime Achievement Award
 Natalie Portman and Ron Howard with Best Director
 Greta Gerwig introduced Lady Bird
 Emma Watson and Robert Pattinson with Best Miniseries or Television Film
 Jessica Chastain and Chris Hemsworth with Best Actress – Motion Picture Comedy or Musical
 Dakota Johnson introduced Call Me by Your Name
 Salma Hayek introduced Three Billboards Outside Ebbing, Missouri
 Alicia Vikander and Michael Keaton with Best Motion Picture – Musical or Comedy
 Geena Davis and Susan Sarandon with Best Actor – Motion Picture Drama
 Isabelle Huppert and Angelina Jolie with Best Actress in a Motion Picture – Drama
 Barbra Streisand with Best Motion Picture – Drama

Golden Globe Ambassador 
Previously known as Miss or Mr. Golden Globe, the title was changed this ceremony to Golden Globe Ambassador to better reflect inclusiveness. The inaugural ambassador was Simone Garcia Johnson, daughter of Dwayne Johnson and Dany Garcia.

Time's Up movement 
Due to the Weinstein effect, many attendees wore black in support of the Time's Up movement, and wore corresponding #MeToo pins. Tarana Burke, who created the "Me too" movement in 2006, attended the awards as a guest of Michelle Williams.

Activist guests 
Activists attended the ceremony as guests, namely: Tarana Burke as a guest of Michelle Williams, Rosa Clemente as a guest of Susan Sarandon, Saru Jayaraman as a guest of Amy Poehler, Billie Jean King as a guest of Emma Stone, Marai Larasi as a guest of Emma Watson, Calina Lawrence as a guest of Shailene Woodley, Ai-jen Poo as a guest of Meryl Streep, and Mónica Ramírez as a guest of Laura Dern.

Reception

Ratings
The ceremony averaged a Nielsen 5.0 ratings/18 share, and was watched by 19.0 million viewers. The ratings was a five percent decline from the previous ceremony's viewership of 20.02 million, becoming the lowest since 2012.

In Memoriam
No "In Memoriam" section was broadcast on television during the ceremony, so the HFPA included a slideshow on their website, and they included the following names:
 Jerry Lewis
 Glen Campbell
 Jeanne Moreau
 Martin Landau
 John G. Avildsen
 Roger Moore
 Jonathan Demme
 Christine Kaufmann
 Richard Hatch
 John Hurt
 Mike Connors
 Mary Tyler Moore
 Michèle Morgan
 William Peter Blatty

See also
 90th Academy Awards
 45th Annie Awards
 23rd Critics' Choice Awards
 71st British Academy Film Awards
 38th Golden Raspberry Awards
 21st Hollywood Film Awards
 33rd Independent Spirit Awards
 22nd Satellite Awards
 24th Screen Actors Guild Awards

References

External links
 
 
 

2017 awards in the United States
2017 film awards
2017 in California
2017 television awards
2010s in Los Angeles County, California
075
January 2018 events in the United States